Pablo is a Cuban village and consejo popular ("popular council") belonging to the municipality of Primero de Enero, in Ciego de Avila Province. It was founded in 1962 and has a population of 671.

Economy
The economy is centered in the agriculture of sugarcane, livestock and growing various crops.

Education
Pablo has a primary school for children attending first to sixth grade.

Health
A Medico de Familia clinic and a pharmacy provide health services to residents.

See also

El Canario

References

Populated places in Ciego de Ávila Province